Felix Maina (born 24 August 1954) is a Kenyan boxer. He competed in the men's flyweight event at the 1972 Summer Olympics.

References

1954 births
Living people
Kenyan male boxers
Olympic boxers of Kenya
Boxers at the 1972 Summer Olympics
Place of birth missing (living people)
Flyweight boxers